Jędrzychowice  is a village in the administrative district of Gmina Zgorzelec, within Zgorzelec County, Lower Silesian Voivodeship, in south-western Poland, close to the German border.

It is known as the site of a road border crossing of the Polish A4 autostrada with the German Bundesautobahn 4 at Görlitz-Ludwigsdorf. Border controls have been abolished upon the accession of Poland to the Schengen Area in 2007.

In 2009 the village had a population of 679.

Gallery

References

Villages in Zgorzelec County